Thore Baardsen Pedersen (born 11 August 1996) is a Norwegian football midfielder who plays for SK Brann.

References

1996 births
Living people
People from Haugesund
Norwegian footballers
SK Vard Haugesund players
FK Haugesund players
SK Brann players
Norwegian First Division players
Eliteserien players
Association football midfielders
Norway youth international footballers
Sportspeople from Rogaland